How Much Wood Would a Woodchuck Chuck (German: Beobachtungen zu einer neuen Sprache, literally "Observations of a New Language") is a 1976 documentary film by German director Werner Herzog, produced by Werner Herzog Filmproduktion. It is a 44-minute film documenting the World Livestock Auctioneer Championship held in New Holland, Pennsylvania. The film also contains a section about the Amish and shows Amish speaking Pennsylvania German.

Herzog has said that he believes auctioneering to be "the last poetry possible, the poetry of capitalism." Herzog describes the auctioneering as an "extreme language ... frightening but quite beautiful at the same time."

Herzog used two of the featured auctioneers Ralph Wade and Scott McKain as actors in his later film Stroszek.

Cinematographer Edward Lachman got his start working with Herzog on this film; he would work on La Soufrière (1977) shortly after.

References

External links
 
 

1976 films
1976 documentary films
German documentary films
West German films
Documentary films about words and language
Films shot in Pennsylvania
Auction chant
Amish in films
Documentary films about Pennsylvania
Films directed by Werner Herzog
1970s German films